Iuput I (or Auput I) was an ancient Egyptian co-regent of his father pharaoh Pedubast I during the early 23rd Dynasty.

Biography
The exact dates of his coregency are unknown. It started possibly around 815 BC, or alternatively in the final couple of years of his father's reign; one authority provides the dates circa 816 to 800 BC. His highest date is a regnal year 12 found carved in an inscription on the roof of the Khonsu Temple at Karnak. A year 9 is also attested for him on the roof of the temple. Helen Jacquet-Gordon published a transcription of Iuput I's Years 9 and 12 of the Khonsu temple graffito, in which it is named "Graffito 244" and "Graffito 245A-B".

References

9th-century BC Pharaohs
8th-century BC Pharaohs
Pharaohs of the Twenty-third Dynasty of Egypt